Kenstar Kharshong (born 3 May 1999), is an Indian professional footballer who plays as a defender for Kenkre in the I-League.

Career

Youth and early career
Kharshong is a product of Shillong Lajong Academy and was promoted to their senior team in 2017. He totally made 19 appearances for the club during his debut season in the 2017–18 I-League. In the following 2018-19 season, he made 11 appearances for the club.

Kerala Blasters
He was loaned to Kerala Blasters in 2019. He made 3 appearances for their reserves side in the I-League 2nd Division.

On 2020, he was offered a contract into the senior team of the club and finally signed a multi-year deal with the club on an undisclosed transfer fee.

Career statistics

Club

References

Shillong Lajong FC players
1999 births
Living people
Footballers from Meghalaya
Indian footballers
Association football defenders
Kerala Blasters FC Reserves and Academy players